Slime Season 2 (stylized as SLIME SEA2ON) is the eighth self-released mixtape by American rapper Young Thug. It was released on October 31, 2015, as the second installment in the Slime Season series, which compiled mostly leaked and unreleased material dating back at least a year. It features production from London on da Track, Wheezy, Metro Boomin and Ricky Racks, among others. The project enlists guest features from Lil Uzi Vert, Trouble (rapper), Shad Da God, Yak Gotti, Rich Homie Quan and Birdman.

Background
In September 2015, Young Thug released the 18-track Slime Season mixtape for free digital download. Its sequel, Slime Season 2, was released only a month later through the same platforms. The trilogy was completed with Slime Season 3 (2016), which received a commercial release.

Critical reception

Slime Season 2 received widespread acclaim from critics. At Metacritic, which assigns a normalized rating out of 100 to reviews from mainstream publications, the album received an average score of 81, based on four reviews, which indicates "universal acclaim". Meaghan Garvey of Pitchfork stated that Slime Season 2 was "a more carefully constructed work than its predecessor in every sense" and "presents him instead as a storyteller in the magical realist tradition, drawing glimmers of nonplussed fascination out of the rational world. Within this context, his habit for working in small-scale, occasionally disjointed bursts, recording each line spontaneously, makes perfect sense. His thoughts fracture and wander down unpredictable paths, forcing us to draw connections in non-linear ways."

Paul Thompson of Spin commented that Slime Season 2 "continues to give context and direction as to the rapper's wealth of unorganized material. This time, it's constructed with more precision, playing out as one long crescendo. As always, Thug is wildly inventive with the form, pulling melodies out of thin air and rapping like the walls are closing in. Slime Season 2 gives him ample negative space to do so."

Track listing

References

2015 mixtape albums
Young Thug albums
Sequel albums
Albums produced by TM88
Albums produced by Southside (record producer)
Albums produced by London on da Track
Albums produced by Metro Boomin